Francesco Franceschi (March 2, 1843 – November 27, 1924) – known in Italy by his title and birth name of Cavalier Emanuele Orazio Fenzi – was an Italian banker and  horticulturist who spent part of his later career in the United States, where his efforts contributed to the introduction of new plant species in southern California.

Early life
Cavalier. Emanuele Orazio Fenzi was born on March 12, 1843, in Florence, Italy to Orazio Fenzi (1817–1850) and Countess Emilia della Gherardesca (1801–1850), the former being a member of the wealthy Fenzi family involved in banking and railroads. He was the grandson of Emanuele Fenzi, and he was raised at Palazzo Fenzi by his grandparents following the early death of his parents. In 1864, Fenzi, earned a Doctor of Political Science and Administration degree from University of Pisa. Although he manifested an early interest in botany and gardening – especially tropical species – he initially acceded to his grandfather's desire that he go into the Banca Fenzi. He pursued his horticultural interests at the Villa Sant'Andrea in Percussina where he developed a botanical garden. He was a founding member of the Italian Botanical Society (it) in 1888, and he was a member of the Royal Tuscan Society of Horticulture (it), serving first as its secretary and then as its president. Over the course of his life, he developed into an expert on succulents, palms, and bamboo, and he is credited with introducing such species as bamboo and eucalyptus into Italy. In 1878, he introduced the first threshing machine to Italy.

In 1870, Emanuele Orazio Fenzi married his first cousin, Cristina (1851–1927), one of six born to the marriage of Cavalier Sebastiano Fenzi (1822–1901) and Emily Verity (1827–1869). In 1891, following an economic crisis in Italy that decimated the family's Bank and wealth, and as a part of a major Italian diaspora that began around 1880, Fenzi emigrated with his wife and three of their children to America. For his new life in the United States, he took a new name: Francesco Franceschi.

California years

After two years in Los Angeles, Franceschi moved to Santa Barbara. There, he and local landscape architect Charles Frederick Eaton jointly founded the Southern California Acclimatizing Association in 1893 to introduce new species from around the world to California. It was initially headquartered at Eaton's Montecito estate of Riso Rivo, which became a botanical nursery for their experiments in plant propagation. Eaton planted an enormous variety of both native and non-native trees at Riso Rivo, including live oak, camphor, cinnamon, avocado, Abyssinian banana, candlenut, and many species of citrus and palms. Many kinds of seeds were also grown on the estate in their attempt to determine  which were suitable for southern California's Mediterranean climate.

The partnership with Eaton ended in 1895 when Franceschi moved the SCAA to Santa Barbara from Riso Rivo, where he ran it as a combination experiment station and commercial nursery. He incorporated the SCAA in 1907 as a partnership with a local nurseryman named Peter Riedel who had immigrated from Holland. During this phase of the SCAA's existence, it propagated trees for use along Santa Barbara's city streets, some of which can still be seen. The partnership ended badly after just two years, in a lawsuit between the partners from which Riedel walked away with both the SCAA and its prime location in downtown Santa Barbara. Today the SCAA is recognized as the first nursery to "scientifically evaluate new plants for California's climatic conditions". The SCAA's 1900 general catalog runs to over 100 pages of trees (especially palms, cycads, and bamboo), shrubs, and flowers. There are special sections on fruit-bearing plants, California natives, trees for street planting, and drought-resistant plants.

In 1903, Franceschi's wife bought 40 acres of land on Mission Ridge Road in Santa Barbara. They named the property Montarioso and built an American Craftsman style redwood house on it. It was one of the earliest houses built in what is now known as Santa Barbara's Riviera. Franceschi turned about 10 acres of the land—which at 800 feet above sea level was in an almost entirely frost-free zone—into a scientifically organized nursery and botanic garden. Franceschi was an early advocate of xeriscaping, and the grounds of Montarioso included many species of cactus, aloe, agave, acacia, and—most spectacularly—a palm tree "amphitheater" embracing about a hundred different species that he had grown from seed. He experimented with the low-growing ornamental frogfruit as an alternative to traditional lawns.

Ultimately, through Franceschi's (and the SCAA's) efforts, some 200 new plant species were introduced to California. Two years before he died, Franceschi was awarded the Frank N. Meyer Memorial Medal by the American Genetic Association in recognition of his contributions to his adopted country. Frank Nicholas Meyer (1875–1918) is the namesake of the award.

Franceschi was the first scientist to describe the Franceschi palm (Brahea elegans), which was named for him. It is currently considered a synonym for Brahea armata, also known as Mexican blue palm, though a few experts hold it to be a locally adapted variety of Brahea aculeata due to its similar morphology and coloration.

During the American years, Franceschi was also a contributor to Bailey's Cyclopedia of American Horticulture and published a comprehensive account of local gardens (Santa Barbara Exotic Flora, 1895).

Later years and legacy

By 1909, partly as a result of the SCAA lawsuit, Franceschi was in financial difficulties. After the city of Santa Barbara failed to take up his proposal to turn Montarioso into a city-sponsored arboretum, he began selling off parts of the property. Not long afterwards, after two decades in southern California, Franceschi moved back to Italy with his wife and took up his birth surname of Fenzi again. In 1912, the Italian government hired him to go to Libya—then the colony of Italian Tripolitania within Italian North Africa—and work on introducing new plant species suitable for the north African climate. In Libya, he started a nursery and a number of related projects: a collection of date species from around Tripoli, a herbarium of native plants, and a reorganization of the library at the School of Agriculture. His plant introductions in Libya include eucalyptus (which his nursery supplied for planting along Libya's railroad lines), avocado, Natal plum, and bamboo.

Fenzi died in Libya in 1924. After his death, part of his Santa Barbara estate was bought by a wealthy American philanthropist, Alden Freeman, who greatly admired Franceschi's work. Through his efforts, the property was enlarged and the house remodeled in a Mediterranean style. In 1931, Freeman donated them to the city of Santa Barbara. The grounds are now open to the public as Franceschi Park, while funds are being sought to convert Franceschi House (which suffered decades of deferred maintenance and general neglect) to a horticultural center.

Partial list of Franceschi's plant introductions to California
 Bailey acacia, 1908
 Blue trumpet vine, 1908
 Brazilian pepper, 1897
 Climbing aloe, 1908
 Floss silk tree, 1897
 Natal plum, 1908
 Pineapple guava, 1905
 Tipu tree, 1897
 Japanese wisteria, 1908

See also 
 Franceschi Park, Santa Barbara, major portion founded June 1931; small additions 1962, 1964, and 1976
 :Category:University of Pisa alumni (under the name: Emanuele Orazio Fenzi)
 Margaret Bell Douglas (1880–1963), Canadian botanist and horticulturist known for her work in the Southwestern United States and Mexico

Bibliography

Notes

References to linked inline notes

 
 
 

 
 

 

 
<li> "Bolusanthus speciosus". p. 60.
<li> "Cephalostachyum pergracile". p. 62.
<li> "Chamaedorea bambusoides" (sv). p. 63.
<li> "Cocos Arechavaletana". p. 64.
<li> "Cocos campestris" (es). p. 64.
<li> "Cocos pulposa". p. 64.
<li> "Erythea Brandegeei" (es). p. 67.
<li> "Erythea elegans". p. 67.
<li> "Herbertia platensis" (sv). pp. 68–69.
<li> "Livistona mariae". p. 71.
<li> "Oreodoxa borinquena". p. 75.
<li> "Pritchardia Wrightii". p. 78.
<li> "Stereospermum sinicum". p. 83.
<li> "Xanthosoma nuevoleonense". p. 84.
<li> "Xylosma Salzmanni". p. 85.

 .

 

  (volume).  (entry).
 

 

 .

General references (not linked to notes) 

 

 

 Continued in the following issues:
<li> Vol. 2, no. 2. January 1909
<li> Vol. 2, no. 3. February 1909
<li> Vol. 2, no. 4. March 1909
 
 This paper was scheduled to have been presented at the International Conference of Plant Hardiness and Acclimatization, hosted by the Horticulture Society of New York, October 1, 2, and 3, 1907, in rooms at the American Institute and the Museum Building of the New York Botanical Garden. 
 (American Breeders Magazine and the association's Annual Report, was, in 1914, absorbed by the Journal of Heredity).  (publication; web).  (publication; print).  (article).
 
 Francesco Franceschi papers, 1904–1918. University of California, Berkeley, Bancroft Library, History of Science and Technology Collection. . "Guide to the Francesco Franceschi Papers, 1904–1918". Online Archive of California (OAC)

   (web).  (print).

 

American horticulturists
1843 births
1924 deaths
Scientists from Florence
Italian gardeners
Italian emigrants to the United States